Fantômas contre Scotland Yard ("Fantomas Against Scotland Yard") is the final installment of a trilogy of films starring Jean Marais as the arch villain Fantômas name opposite Louis de Funès as the earnest but outclassed commissaire Juve and the journalist Fandor, also played by Marais. The trilogy was France's humorous answer, starting in 1964, to the James Bond phenomenon that swept the world at around the same time. The Fantômas films became extremely successful in Europe and USSR, and found success even in the United States and Japan where fan websites exist to this day.

Plot 
In the third and final film of the trilogy, Fantômas imposes a head tax on the rich, threatening to kill those who do not comply. Journalist Fandor and commissaire Juve are invited to Scotland by Lord McRashley (played by Jean-Roger Caussimon). Lord McRashley, one of Fantômas' potential victims, uses his castle as the headquarters to set up a trap for the menace called Fantômas.

Cast

Release 
The film premiered in France on 16 March 1967. It was filmed in Château de Roquetaillade.

The film had admissions in France of 3,557,971.

The Fantômas trilogy

References

External links 
 
 Site officiel de château de Roquetaillade

1960s crime comedy films
1960s comedy thriller films
1967 films
Films directed by André Hunebelle
Films set in Scotland
Films set in castles
French comedy films
French crime films
1960s French-language films
French sequel films
Fantômas films
1967 comedy films
1960s French films